Sri Sri University is an Indian university established on 26 December 2009. The university came into operation in the year 2012. At present, the university is offering different courses in areas of management, architecture, humanities, agriculture, health and wellness, science, literature, osteopathy and performing & fine arts.

Founder
Sri Sri Ravi Shankar is the founder of Sri Sri University. Popularly known as Sri Sri, he has been an advocate of India's ancient traditions, scientific knowledge and spiritual heritage.

History
On 22 February 2012, Sri Sri University was notified by the Higher Education Department of the Government of Odisha as a legal entity after clearing a High Power Committee (HPC) scrutiny of its infrastructure, academic, regulatory, financial and manpower preparedness. The notification has featured in an extraordinary issue of Government of Odisha Gazette.

Statutory approvals
The university has received approval from the Government of Odisha, University Grants Commission, All India Council for Technical Education and Council of Architecture to offer its degree programmes. As an independent university Sri Sri University is also empowered as per the Sri Sri University Act 2009 to offer new courses as and when required.

Awards
Sri Sri University's focus on sustainable living, emphasis on synthesis of ancient and modern  along with innovation in teaching learning process have been appreciated and received recognition.,

Environment Friendly Green Campus Award by District Administration, Cuttack, 2016 
'Prakruti Mitra Award 2016' by Minister – Forest & Environment 
'Sri Sri University as the Trend setting synthesizer of traditional and global outlook' by ASSOCHAM, 2017
Best Innovative University Award-Second National Education Summit and Educational Excellence Awards 2017
Nominated for Non-Violence Award by Non-Violence Project India Foundation, 2018
‘Green U Award 2019’ and ‘Inspiring Climate Educator Award 2019’ for bringing Nature into Higher Education at the National Green Mentors Conference, Ahmedabad.

Campus
The campus houses the admin block, academic block, computer lab, library, seminar halls, practise halls, amphitheatre, hostels, Vidya (skill training centre), dining hall and cafeteria. The academic block houses classrooms, tutorial centers and a student activity centre. The university offers sports facilities including a gym, basketball court, lawn tennis court, volleyball court and a cricket ground.

Student clubs
There are currently 16 clubs dedicated to different activities.

Vocational training
The university has started a vocational program in collaboration with Larsen & Toubro under its Corporate Social Responsibility commitments. All students of this vocational program are employed by L&T in their domestic and international projects. To begin with the university had started only bar bending and masonry skill programs. But presently new programs like driving, tailoring and other vocations have been included.

Notable alumni
Raghavan Seetharaman achieved a doctorate by submitting a Research Thesis on 'Green Banking and Sustainability' at Sri Sri University. He has also received Pravasi Bharatiya Samman Awards-2017, the highest honour conferred on overseas Indians, from the President of India

References

External links
 Sri Sri University

Sri Sri University
All India Council for Technical Education
Educational institutions established in 2009
Engineering colleges in Odisha
Education in Cuttack
2009 establishments in Orissa
Architecture schools in India
Architectural education